Mount Gipps is a closed railway station on the Broken Hill railway line in New South Wales, Australia, approximately 7 km east of Broken Hill. The station opened in 1919 and closed in 1974. Only the platform face remains. It was located at the historic Mount Gipps Station, one of the first properties settled west of the Darling River in the 1860s.

References

Disused regional railway stations in New South Wales
Railway stations in Australia opened in 1919
Railway stations closed in 1974